Microsoft Math Solver (formerly Microsoft Mathematics and Microsoft Math) is an entry-level educational app that solves math and science problems. Developed and maintained by Microsoft, it is primarily targeted at students as a learning tool. Until 2015, it ran on Microsoft Windows. Since then, it has been developed for the web platform and mobile devices.

Microsoft Math was originally released as a bundled part of Microsoft Student. It was then available as a standalone paid version starting with version 3.0. For version 4.0, it was released as a free downloadable product and was called Microsoft Mathematics 4.0. It is no longer in active development and has been removed from the Microsoft website. A related freeware add-in, called "Microsoft Mathematics Add-In for Word and OneNote," is also available from Microsoft and offers comparable functionality (Word 2007 or higher is required).

Microsoft Math received the 2008 Award of Excellence from Tech & Learning Magazine.

Features 
Microsoft Math contains features that are designed to assist in solving mathematics, science, and tech-related problems, as well as to educate the user. The application features such tools as a graphing calculator and a unit converter. It also includes a triangle solver and an equation solver that provides step-by-step solutions to each problem.

Versions 
 Microsoft Math 1.0: Part of Microsoft Student 2006
 Microsoft Math 2.0: Part of Microsoft Student 2007
 Microsoft Math 3.0: Standalone commercial product that requires product activation; includes calculus support, digital ink recognition features and a special display mode for video projectors
 Encarta Calculator: Lite version of Microsoft Math 3.0; part of Microsoft Student 2008
 Microsoft Mathematics 4.0 (removed): The first freeware version, released in 32-bit and 64-bit editions in January 2011; features a ribbon GUI
Microsoft Math for Windows Phone (removed): A branded mobile application for Windows Phone released in 2015 specifically for South African and Tanzanian students; also known as Nokia Mobile-Mathematics or Nokia Momaths
Microsoft Math in Bing app – Math helper as a feature within the Bing mobile app on iOS and Android platforms, released in August 2018
 Microsoft Math Solver – Mobile app for iOS (first released in November 2019) and Android (first released in December 2019), as well as a Microsoft Edge extension. Recognizes handwritten math. Provides a detailed step-by-step explanation, interactive graphs, relevant online video lectures, and practice problems.

System requirements 
The system requirements for Microsoft Mathematics 4.0 are:

See also 
Grapher
Maple (software)
Symbolab
Wolfram Mathematica
WolframAlpha

References

External links 

Download details: Microsoft Mathematics Add-In for Word and OneNote

Educational math software
Science education software
Mathematical software
Microsoft free software
Nokia services